Villard may refer to:

People
Villard (surname)

Places

France
Villard, Creuse
Villard, Haute-Savoie
Villard-Bonnot, in the Isère department
Villard-de-Lans, in the Isère department
Villard-d'Héry, in the Savoie department
Villard-Léger, in the Savoie department
Villard-Notre-Dame, in the Isère department
Villard-Reculas, in the Isère department
Villard-Reymond, in the Isère department
Villard-Saint-Christophe, in the Isère department
Villard-Saint-Sauveur, in the Jura department
Villard-Sallet, in the Savoie department
Villard-sur-Bienne, in the Jura department
Villard-sur-Doron, in the Savoie department

United States
Villard, Minnesota
Villard Township, Todd County, Minnesota
Villard Township, McHenry County, North Dakota, former county seat of McHenry County, North Dakota
Villard Hall, a building on the University of Oregon campus

Other uses
 Villard grapes, French wine hybrid grapes including the Villard noir and the Villard blanc
 Villard (imprint), an imprint of Random House